John Heigham (MP) (died 1626) was a leading Suffolk gentleman and politician. He was Sheriff of Suffolk in 1577.

Family
His father was Clement Higham, a lawyer and also a politician who was Speaker of the House of Commons in 1554, His mother was Anne, Waldegrave daughter of George Waldegrave of Smallbridge. She was also the widow of Henry Bures of Acton.

References

1626 deaths
High Sheriffs of Suffolk